Joseph Mugenyi Sabiiti (born 9 May 1948), is a Roman Catholic priest, who is the Auxiliary Bishop of the Roman Catholic Diocese of Fort Portal, in Uganda. He was appointed bishop on 2 January 1999.

Early life and priesthood
Sabiiti was born on 9 May 1948, at Nyansozi Village, in present-day Kabarole District in the  Western Region of Uganda. He was ordained priest on 1 June 1975 at Fort Portal. He served as priest in the Roman Catholic Diocese of Fort Portal until 2 January 1999.

As bishop
He was appointed Auxiliary Bishop of the Roman Catholic Diocese of Fort Portal, on 2 January 1999. He was consecrated as bishop on 24 April 1999 at Fort Portal by Bishop Paul Lokiru Kalanda†, Bishop of Fort Portal, assisted by Bishop Deogratias Muganwa Byabazaire†, Bishop of Hoima and Archbishop John Baptist Odama, Archbishop of  Gulu.

See also
 Uganda Martyrs
 Roman Catholicism in Uganda

References

External links
Profile of the Diocese of Fort Portal

1948 births
Living people
20th-century Roman Catholic bishops in Uganda
21st-century Roman Catholic bishops in Uganda
People from Kabarole District
Roman Catholic bishops of Fort Portal
Ugandan Roman Catholic bishops